Randy Clark may refer to:

 Randy Clark (American football) (born 1957), American football tackle
 Randy Clark (boxer), American boxer

See also
Randy Clarke, drummer for Out of My Mind / Holy Water
Randolph Clark, founder of Texas Christian University